Samuel Archibald Anthony Hinds (born 27 December 1943) is a Guyanese politician who was Prime Minister of Guyana almost continuously from 1992 to 2015.  He also briefly served as President of Guyana in 1997. He was awarded Guyana's highest national award, the Order of Excellence (O.E.) in 2011.

He first became Prime Minister under Cheddi Jagan in 1992, following the October 1992 election, which was won by an alliance of the People's Progressive Party (PPP) and Hinds' group, Civic. When Jagan died in March 1997, Hinds became President himself, and appointed Jagan's widow Janet as Prime Minister. For the December 1997 General Elections, the PPP/C nominated Hinds as candidate for Prime Minister while Janet Jagan was the candidate for the Presidency. Following the election, Jagan was elected President and re-appointed Hinds as Prime Minister.

Prior to this, Hinds worked for Alcan as head of chemical engineering. By education, Hinds is a licensed and qualified chemical engineer, having graduated from the University of New Brunswick.

In August 1999, President Janet Jagan decided to resign, and temporarily replaced Hinds with Bharrat Jagdeo; Jagdeo thus became President upon her resignation, and he reappointed Hinds as Prime Minister. After the re-election of the government in the 28 August 2006 election, Hinds was sworn in as prime minister again in early September.

He was re-nominated as the 2011 prime ministerial candidate for the PPP in October 2011, although there were suggestions that he might step aside. After PPP/C candidate Donald Ramotar was elected President, Hinds was sworn in as Prime Minister again on 5 December 2011.

Following the opposition's victory in the May 2015 general election, Hinds was succeeded as Prime Minister by Moses Nagamootoo on 20 May 2015.

Sam Hinds is honored in the scientific name of a species of lizard, Kaieteurosaurus hindsi.

Hinds has served as the Guyanese Ambassador to the United States since July 2021.  He presented his credentials on 7 July 2021.

References

|-

|-

|-

1943 births
Afro-Guyanese people
Living people
People from Mahaica-Berbice
Presidents of Guyana
Prime Ministers of Guyana
Vice presidents of Guyana
Recipients of the Order of Excellence of Guyana
University of New Brunswick alumni

People's Progressive Party (Guyana) politicians
Ambassadors of Guyana to the United States